Ko Shu-chin or Ke Shuqin (born 4 November 1967), also known as Samantha Ko, is a Taiwanese actress. She was nominated at 56th Golden Horse Award for Best Leading Actress for her role in A Sun.

Filmography

Film
 Bad Moon (2005)

Short film

Television series

Awards and nominations

References

External links

1967 births
Living people
21st-century Taiwanese actresses
Taiwanese film actresses
Taiwanese television actresses